is the eighth single by Japanese singer/songwriter Chisato Moritaka. Written by Moritaka and Yuichi Takahashi, the single was released by Warner Pioneer on September 25, 1989. The song marked a departure from her previous pop singles, using a 1960s classic rock style. It is included in the 1991 remix album The Moritaka.

Music video 
The music video was filmed at the Las Vegas Club, with Moritaka playing a Rickenbacker electric guitar alongside a group of American guitarists and a saxophonist on stage. During the time, she only started playing the electric guitar and would not master it until her sixth studio album Rock Alive in 1992.

Chart performance 
"Daite" peaked at No. 8 on Oricon's singles chart and sold 57,000 copies.

Other versions 
The album version of "Daite", from the 1989 album Hijitsuryokuha Sengen, is arranged with a slower tempo and less instruments.

Moritaka re-recorded the song and uploaded the video on her YouTube channel on May 6, 2013. This version is also included in Moritaka's 2013 self-covers DVD album Love Vol. 4.

Track listing 
All lyrics are written by Chisato Moritaka; all music is composed and arranged by Yuichi Takahashi.

Personnel 
 Chisato Moritaka – vocals
 Yuichi Takahashi – guitar, synthesizer, programming, backing vocals
 Ken Shima – piano
 Hirokuni Korekata – guitar
 Teruo Goto – tenor saxophone

Chart positions

References

External links 
 
 
 

1989 singles
1989 songs
Japanese-language songs
Chisato Moritaka songs
Songs with lyrics by Chisato Moritaka
Warner Music Japan singles